Kendriya Vidyalaya Bamrauli is a Kendriya Vidyalaya (school for the children of military personnel), located in South Camp which is residential area of Defence personals of the unit in Bamrauli AFS station, Bamrauli, Allahabad, India. It has both primary and secondary departments.

It is one of the best schools of Varanasi Region. It have a strong alumni background, having many IAS and IITian as its alumni.

External links
Official website

Kendriya Vidyalayas in Uttar Pradesh
Primary schools in Uttar Pradesh
High schools and secondary schools in Uttar Pradesh
Schools in Allahabad
Educational institutions in India with year of establishment missing